Antonio Sancho Sánchez (14 March 1976) is a Mexican former footballer. He played as a midfielder and was the captain of Tigres UANL and Pumas UNAM.

Career
Sancho played for six years with Tigres UANL, where he became one of the most trusted players by the fans. A huge number of fans was against his separation of the team, decided by the team's upper management and not by the coach. Among other milestones, Sancho has played 17 Clásico Regiomontano derbies with Tigres.

After Tigres UANL, he returned to Pumas. He had originally joined Pumas youth system and worked his way through the ranks to make his first division debut, becoming an idol and the team captain. Now, in his second spell with Pumas, he has once more taken captain's armband hoping to lead the club out of the relegation position.

Sancho returned to Tigres in 2007 after the loan to Pumas expired. On 2011 he announced his retirement. A hard-tackling midfielder, Sancho was sent off thirteen times in his career.

He now returned to Tigres UANL with a new contract as a Sport Director for the club.

References

External links
  Federación Mexicana de Fútbol Asociación
  TIGRES UANL

1976 births
Living people
Mexico international footballers
1997 Copa América players
2002 CONCACAF Gold Cup players
Tigres UANL footballers
Club Universidad Nacional footballers
Liga MX players
Mexican people of Spanish descent
Footballers from Mexico City
Association football midfielders
Mexican footballers